Manimala  is a small town and a village in Kottayam district in the Indian state of Kerala, situated about  from the nearest town Kanjirappally. It's declared as a  folklore village since 2011 by the central government to promote folklore.

Geography
The area is mostly hilly with Kuranganmala, Varukunnu and Poovatholymala being the most important hills. Ponthenpuzha forest separates the village from Pathanamthitta district.

Climate 
Manimala experiences a tropical climate with sufficient rainfalls in the months of June, July, August and October. Average annual precipitation here is 2820 mm. Humidity rises during the months of March and April. Average annual temperature is 31.14°C. Temperature falls during the end of year. The place also receives locally developed thundershowers.

Education
Manimala is acclaimed for its high literacy rate and access to primary and secondary education facilities within walking distance. There are four high schools within  of the town centre. These are C.C.M Higher Secondary School, Karikkattoor; St.George Higher Secondary School, Manimala; Cardinal Padiyara Public School and K.J.C.M.H.S Pulikkallu.  In recent years the schools have undergone significant modernisation with the installation of state of the art facilities such as IT and science labs. Also, higher secondary schools such as C.C.M Higher Secondary School, Karikkattoor and St.George Higher Secondary School and Cardinal Padiyara school have benefited from the construction of modern school buildings and other facilities. 

The village boasts a hundred percent literacy rate. Girls are generally high achievers than boys at schools and universities. The people from all religions, mostly Syrian Christians, Hindus and Muslims live in harmony and peace in this village. The majestic Holy Magi's Forane church remains as a landmark structure at the centre of the village and the church tower (മണി മാളിക ) can be seen from many kilometres away from the village centre.

Economy
Manimala was an important transaction hub for goods from the high range areas of Kerala. The boats from Alappuzha and Changanacherry market used to come to Manimala. The boats could not go up any longer because of the presence of rocks in the river. Thus Manimala naturally became the transaction hub for goods from the high range areas. Later, with large-scale sand and gravel mining in the river, the river became inaccessible for boats. This along with the development of road transports reduced the importance of Manimala. The village has many commercial banks such as Catholic Syrian Bank, Federal Bank Ltd, Co-Operative Bank, and government-owned State Bank of India. Access to modern health care is also possible through village-based primary health center and other seven modern hospitals within 16 kilometers. The River Manimala and the Manimala bridge are the two nostalgic symbols to the people of Manimala.

Access
Manimala has access to all major cities and inter national airports in Kerala through roadways. The nearest railway stations are at Kottayam, (district headquarters) and Changanacherry. Manimala lies on the main eastern highway (SH-8) in between Ponkunnam and Ranni. Both privately operated and state owned buses provides services to Manimala from dawn to dusk.

Also the proposed Sabarigiri International Airport will be constructed by acquiring Cheruvally Estate which is nearly only five kilometers away from Manimala town centre

Demographics
As of 2011 India census, Manimala had a population of 21053 of which 10213 are males and 10840 are females. Majority are plantation owners whose main income comes from rubber plantations. . The planters of Manimala are mostly Catholic Syrian Christians, who are the descendants of settler farmers who migrated to the region from Kuravilangad and Meenachil regions centuries ago.

Places of worship

There are many places to worship in the village, one of which is the Manimalkkavu Bhagavathi Temple, which at one point owned a lot of land in the area, which included the villages of Manimala and Vellavoor. 

 Manimalkkavu Bhagavathi Temple
 Kulathumkal Sreedevi Temple
 Kadayanickadu Bhagavathy Temple
 Kadayanickadu Dharmashastha Temple
 Koodathingal Mahadeva Temple
 Moongani Sree Dhrama Sastha temple
 Manimala Town Mosque
 Holy Magi Forane Church (Pazhaya Palli - Archdiocese of Changanacherry)
 St. Basil's Church (Puthan Palli - Archdiocese of Changanacherry)
 SH Church Karimpanakulam [Archdiocese of changanacherry]
 St. Mary’s church, Vallamchira (Archdiocese of Changanacherry)

The parish feast of Manimala Holy Magi Church is world-famous. Thousands of people from all across the world come here for the feast in January. This feast is celebrated by people of all religion.

See also
 Kanjirappally
 Manimala river

References

Villages in Kottayam district